Pyrazolam (SH-I-04) is a benzodiazepine derivative originally developed by a team led by Leo Sternbach at Hoffman-La Roche in the 1970s. It has since been "rediscovered" and sold as a designer drug since 2012.

Pyrazolam has structural similarities to alprazolam and bromazepam. Unlike other benzodiazepines, pyrazolam does not appear to undergo metabolism, instead being excreted unchanged in the urine. It is most selective for the α2 and α3 subtypes of the GABAA receptor.

Legal Status

United Kingdom 
In the UK, pyrazolam has been classified as a Class C drug by section 5 of the May 2017 amendment to The Misuse of Drugs Act 1971 along with several other designer benzodiazepine drugs.

See also 
 List of benzodiazepine designer drugs

References 

Triazolobenzodiazepines
GABAA receptor positive allosteric modulators
Designer drugs
2-Pyridyl compounds
Bromoarenes